A kettle, sometimes called a tea kettle or teakettle, is a type of pot specialized for boiling water, commonly with a lid, spout, and handle, or a small electric kitchen appliance of similar shape that functions in a self-contained manner. Kettles can be heated either by placing on a stove, or by their own internal electric heating element in the appliance versions.

Etymology 
The word kettle originates from Old Norse ketill "cauldron". The Old English spelling was cetel with initial che- [tʃ] like 'cherry', Middle English (and dialectal) was chetel, both come (together with German Kessel "cauldron") ultimately from Germanic *katilaz, that was borrowed from Latin catillus, diminutive form of catinus "deep vessel for serving or cooking food", which in various contexts is translated as "bowl", "deep dish", or "funnel".

Stovetop kettles 

A modern stovetop kettle is a metal vessel, with a flat bottom, used to heat water on a stovetop or hob. They usually have a handle on top, a spout, and a lid. Some also have a steam whistle that indicates when the water has reached boiling point.

Kettles are typically made with stainless steel, but can also be made from copper or other metals.

Electric kettles 

In countries with 200240V mains electricity, electric kettles are commonly used to boil water without the necessity of a stove top. The heating element is typically fully enclosed, with a power rating of 2–3 kW. This means that the current draw for an electric kettle is up to 13A, which is a sizeable proportion of the current available for many homes: the main fuse of most homes varies between 20 and 100 amps. In countries with 120 V mains electricity, twice as much current is drawn for the same power.

In modern designs, once the water has reached boiling point, the kettle automatically deactivates, preventing the water from boiling away and damaging the heating element. A more upright design, the "jug"-style electrical kettle, can be more economical to use, since even one cup of water will keep the element covered.

In the United States, an electric kettle may sometimes be referred to as a hot pot.

In New Zealand a kettle is referred to as a jug.

Development 
Electric kettles were introduced as an alternative to stovetop kettles in the latter part of the 19th century. In 1893 the Crompton and Co. firm in the United Kingdom started featuring electric kettles in their catalogue. However, these first electric kettles were quite primitive as the heating element couldn't be immersed in the water. Instead, a separate compartment underneath the water storage area in the kettle was used to house the electric heating element. The design was inefficient even relative to the conventional stove-top kettles of the time.

In 1902, the 'Archer' electric kettle made by Premier Electric Heaters in Birmingham, England, was marketed as a luxury item. It had an element sealed in the base of the kettle (not exposed to water), and was one of the first kettles with a boil-safe device.

In 1922, Leslie Large, an engineer working at Bulpitt & Sons of Birmingham, designed an element of wire wound around a core and sheathed in a metal tube. The element could be immersed directly into water which made the kettle much more efficient than stovetop kettles.

In 1955, the newly founded British company Russell Hobbs brought out its stainless steel K1 model as the first fully automatic kettle. A thermostat, heated through a pipe by the steam produced as the water comes to the boil, flexes, thereby cutting off the current. Notably as little steam is produced before boiling occurs, so the thermostat is set to activate well below 100C, and thus this simple design works well even at high altitude where the boiling point is significantly lower. The design has since been widely adopted by other manufacturers.

Whistling kettles 

A whistling kettle is a kettle fitted with a device that emits an audible whistle when the water in the kettle starts to boil. The action of steam passing through the device causes vibration, in turn creating the sound, known in physics as a tone hole.

The exact mechanism by which this occurs was not fully understood until a paper, The aeroacoustics of a steam kettle, was published by R. H. Henrywood, a fourth-year engineering undergraduate at the University of Cambridge, and A. Agarwal, his supervisor, in the journal Physics of Fluids in 2013.

Harry Bramson is the inventor of the whistling tea kettle.

Automatic tea kettles 
These are relatively new kinds of tea kettles. They are high tech kitchen appliances that are geared towards making tea brewing easy for everyone. They are built with the capability to intelligently make different kinds of tea without much input from the user.

Once set, the automatic tea kettle brings the water to the specific temperature for preparing a given kind of tea, adds the tea to the water, and steeps the tea for the appropriate amount of time. Often they will make a beeping sound to alert the user when the tea is ready, and maintain the temperature of the beverage after preparation.

Kettle gallery

Similar devices 
 A cauldron is a large kettle hung over an open fire, usually on an arc-shaped hanger called a bail. In Hungary these are referred to as kettles.
 A fish kettle is a long slim metal cooking vessel with a tight fitting lid to enable cooking of whole large fish such as salmon.
 A kettle grill is a dome shaped grill with a rounded lid, resembling a cauldron.
 A kettle drum is a kettle (cauldron) shaped drum.

See also 
 Boiling vessel, water heating system in British tanks
 Coffeemaker
 Kelly Kettle, specialized types of kettles for outdoor use, intended to use fuel more efficiently
 Kettle corn, a sweet variety of popcorn that is typically mixed or seasoned with a light-colored refined sugar, salt, and oil. It was traditionally made in cast iron kettles, hence the name.
 Percolator
 Samovar, a kettle with central firepit and chimney for making tea and serving it hot in Russia, Iran, Turkey and around
 Tea culture
 Teapot, a vessel with spout, lid, and handle, for brewing and serving tea
 Teasmade, an English appliance that combined a kettle and a teapot to make tea automatically by a clock
 Tetsubin, a cast iron Japanese pot with a spout
 Windermere kettle
The pot calling the kettle black
Teaware
Kettlebell, ball with handle

References

Further reading 

 Stevenson, Seth (Nov. 8, 2005). "A Watched Pot". Slate.
 

Cooking appliances
Teaware
Boilers (cookware)